Thomas Murdoch of Cumloden (1758–1846) was a Scottish merchant in Madeira. He was elected a Fellow of the Royal Society in 1805.

Murdoch was a son of Patrick Murdoch, who emigrated with his other sons to the United States of America. He became a partner in a firm of merchants in Madeira, returning to the United Kingdom in 1803. The civil servant Clinton Murdoch was his son.

Notes

1758 births
1846 deaths
Scottish merchants
Fellows of the Royal Society